Kieran Dempsey is an Australian former head coach of North Sydney who played in the National Rugby League competition.  Dempsey was the last head coach of the club when they were a first grade side.

Coaching career
Dempsey was the assistant coach to North Sydney head coach Peter Louis during the 1999 NRL season.  Midway through 1999, Louis departed the club after 7 seasons in charge and Dempsey was promoted to be the new head coach.  

At the time of his appointment, Norths were sitting 12th on the table and were enduring one of their toughest seasons.  Dempsey's first six games in charge all ended in defeats including a 56–18 loss against Cronulla-Sutherland.

Dempsey's first win came in round 25 1999 against Melbourne at North Sydney Oval which would also prove to be the club's last first grade game played at the ground.

The following week, Dempsey coached Norths in their final game as a first grade side when they faced North Queensland at the Willows Sports Complex.  North Sydney would win the match 28–18.  At the conclusion of 1999, Norths fell victim to the NRL's rationalisation policy and were forced to merge with arch rivals Manly-Warringah to form the Northern Eagles.

Post coaching
In 2014, Dempsey was hired as a talent scout for Melbourne.  Dempsey later joined the club's recruitment and pathways team.

References

Living people
Australian rugby league coaches
North Sydney Bears coaches
Year of birth missing (living people)
Place of birth missing (living people)